Consort De may refer to:

Noble Consort Zheng (1565–1630), concubine of the Wanli Emperor
Empress Xiaogongren (1660–1723), concubine of the Kangxi Emperor